The Heavenly Kings (四大天王) is a 2006 Hong Kong film directed by Daniel Wu.

Background
In 2005, Chinese media began to report that Daniel Wu had formed a boyband, Alive, with Terence Yin, Andrew Lin and Conroy Chan. Wu and his band mates posted information, updates, personal thoughts (including slamming Hong Kong Disneyland, for which they were spokespersons) and the band's music, at their official website. In 2006, Wu made his writing and directorial debut with The Heavenly Kings, which chronicles Alive's formation and exploits. After the film's release, however, it was revealed that The Heavenly Kings was actually a mockumentary of the Hong Kong pop music industry and Alive was constructed purely as a vehicle to make the movie; the film's characters represented only 10-15% of their real-life counterparts and much of the footage blurred the line between fiction and reality. Wu admitted his own singing voice "sucked really bad," and the band had their voices digitally enhanced for its music, to prove that "it's easy to fake it."

Cast and roles
 Conroy Chan Chi-Chung - Himself
 Jackie Chan - Cameo (uncredited)
 Jaycee Chan - Cameo
 Jacky Cheung - Cameo
 Stephen Fung - Cameo
 Josie Ho - Cameo (uncredited)
 Tony Ho
 Ella Koon - Cameo (uncredited)
 Jo Kuk - Kei Kei (as Jo Koo) 
 Andrew Lin - Himself
 Candy Lo - Cameo
 Karen Mok - Cameo
 Jason Tobin - Sandy
 Nicholas Tse - Cameo
 Paul Wong - Cameo
 Daniel Wu - Himself
 Miriam Yeung - Cameo
 Terence Yin - Himself

Reception
Despite some backlash from the media over being intentionally fed false information in the movie about illegal downloads of the band's music, Wu won the best new director award for the film at the 26th Hong Kong Film Awards, an achievement he called "a group effort." The film has also been nominated for Best Original Film Song at the same Awards ceremony: Composer: Davy Chan; Lyricist: Li Jin Yi and Singer: Alive.

References

External links
 
 The Heavenly Kings at HK Cinemagic
 Review at sanfranciscochinatown.com
 loveHKfilm entry
 Interview with Terence Yin: "Heavenly Kings: Revealing the Entertainment Industry". 28 December 2008.

2006 films
Hong Kong musical films
2000s mockumentary films
2006 directorial debut films
Hong Kong comedy-drama films